Sathasivam Baskaran  was a  minority Sri Lankan Tamil distributor for the Tamil newspaper Uthayan  from Jaffna, Sri Lanka. He was shot and killed by unknown assailants on 15 August 2006 at Puthur junction near Atchchuveli while returning after delivering the paper after the curfew hours which are in force in Jaffna. He is fourth employee of the Uthayan newspaper to be killed.

Background
Sathasivam Baskaran was part of a series of killing of Tamil media workers particularly those seen supporting the Tamil nationalist cause as the newspaper Uthayan was seen to be doing. It was seen as part of the intimidation of Tamil media. The office of Sudar Oli an associated newspaper with Uthayan was searched by the Sri Lankan army on the same day. Free Media Movement an International Federation of Journalists associate reported that newspapers like Sudor Oli and Thinakkural have received threats from anti-LTTE para-military groups demanding that their distribution be stopped and there were attempts to unofficially censure Tamil media organisations.

Incident

Sathasivam Baskaran was killed during the relaxation of the strict curfew. Jaffna is under virtual martial raising questions as how assailants could kill him or a series of other journalists and escape. This led to accusations that the killing was carried out by Security forces or paramilitary allied with them.

Reaction
The International Federation of Journalists (IFJ) has demanded an end to the continued and brutal targeting of Tamil media workers.

The IFJ President Christopher Warren said

Government investigation
The International Press Institute has called in for impartial government investigation.

See also
Sri Lankan civil war
Human Rights in Sri Lanka
Notable assassinations of the Sri Lankan Civil War

References

External links
Sri Lanka mission report
 Nine recommendations for improving media freedom in Sri Lanka – RSF
Media in Sri Lanka
Free Speech in Sri Lanka

Year of birth missing
2006 deaths
Deaths by firearm in Sri Lanka
Sri Lankan Tamil people
Sri Lankan murder victims
Sri Lankan Hindus
People murdered in Sri Lanka